Van Stanley Bartholomew Wallach (born 1947) is an American herpetologist and an expert on blindsnakes and on the systematics, internal anatomy, and taxonomy of snakes. He has contributed to the descriptions of at least 46 species of snakes and has conducted fieldwork on tropical snakes in the Philippines, Nicaragua, and the Democratic Republic of the Congo.

For many years Wallach worked as a Curatorial Assistant at the Museum of Comparative Zoology at Harvard University in Cambridge, Massachusetts. He retired from the museum in 2012, but he continues to work on snake taxonomy. Wallach was the lead editor of the 1,227 page authoritative reference book Snakes of the World.

In the 2000s Wallach was one of several herpetologists who became embroiled in a dispute with Raymond Hoser, a self-published Australian herpetologist, over proper nomenclatorial acts. Hoser charged Wallach with attempting to name species that Hoser had already described in his self-published journal. Wallach's coauthors pointed out that Hoser had not complied with the provisions of the ICZN Code. The debate became quite heated, with Hoser charging Wallach with "scientific fraud", whereas nine prominent biologists published a paper in which they, not so indirectly, called Hoser a "taxonomic vandal". The biologists suggested that the herpetofaunal taxa published on or after 1 January 2000 that can be objectively classed as unscientific, non-peer reviewed, misguided in intent or presentation, fraudulent, or lacking evidence should not be used and offered a list of recommended substitutions, as a temporary stop-gap until the ICZN has developed a suitable response to actions of taxonomic vandals. They went on to list over 200 invalid taxonomic names that had been offered by Hoser.

Taxon named in his honor
Boiga wallachi Das, 1998

Taxa credited

Notes

American herpetologists
1947 births
Living people